Újpest FC II is a Hungarian football club, located in Budapest, Hungary. It currently plays in Budapest Class I and acts as a second club to Újpest FC. The team's colors are violet and white.

References

External links
  
 Soccerway

Football clubs in Hungary
Association football clubs established in 1885
1885 establishments in Hungary
Sport in Budapest
Újpest FC